Dilip Cherian (born 10 April in Kerala, India), is a communications consultant, a political campaign advisor and a practicing political & policy professional. He is also involved with political lobbying and bureaucracy decision making.  He was conferred with the Lifetime Achievement Award at the 12th edition of the India PR & Corporate Communications Awards

Educational qualifications

Dilip Cherian went to Don Bosco School in Calcutta. He passed Senior Cambridge Examination with Science, Mathematics, and English as major subjects. In college, Dilip graduated with Honors in Economics from Presidency College, University of Calcutta. He carried on with getting a master's degree in Economics from Delhi School of Economics, the University of Delhi with specializations in International Economics, Public Economics and Industrial Economics. Dilip earned the Gurukul Chevening Fellowship at the London School of Economics in Globalization. He has scholarships from National Merit Scholarship, Presidency College, U.G.C Centre for Advanced Studies Scholarship at the Delhi School of Economics for The Shriram Foundation Fellowship.

Career

Professional experiences

Perfect Relations was among the first agencies to introduce the concept of Image Management in India. The company advises CEO's and country management teams on external communications, internal communications and public relations. It has offices in 16 Indian cities, Nepal, Bangladesh and Sri Lanka today and employs over 500 people, making it South Asia's largest image management consultancy.

Dilip Cherian started his career as Economic Consultant, Bureau of Industrial Costs in the Ministry of Industry, New Delhi. The work involved advising the Central government on regulatory measures regarding pricing, etc.

Dilip also writes  on a weekly basis, India's only column on bureaucracy called Dilli Ka Babu.

Journalistic and media sector
Dilip joined Business India in 1980, where he was responsible for creating a separate section on policy making.

After a long stint as the Editor of Business India, Dilip moved to television and newspaper journalism. Here, he was auxiliary in founding ‘The Observer of Business and Politics'. His work as Business Editor involved the conceptualization and creation of the entire editorial structure of the paper.

Dilip writes columns that have appeared in the Asian Age, The Indian Express, and the Mumbai-based Mid-Day. These columns are based on his views of the country's economic and political environment.

Dilip’s name was also included in the first ever PRWeek Global Power Book 2015. The Power Book is produced by industry magazine PR Week and lists 300 PR leaders from agencies and corporates, who have an influence across multiple borders. It has been described as "the definitive guide to the brightest and most influential PR professionals around the world". Other positions held by him include Nominee Director for the BBC on their media investment in India.

Teaching

Dilip has taught programs for MBA students at the International Management Institute (New Delhi) on Image Management and Communications Strategy and for post-graduate students at MICA (Mudra Institute of Communication), Ahmedabad.

Speaking

Dilip has presented at international panel discussions at the International Public Relations Association IPRA Conference in Cairo; Asia Pacific Workshop of Academic Parliamentarians on Education, Population & Sustainable Development in Krabi, Bangkok, Inter-Pacific Bar Association Women Business Lawyers conference in Hong Kong, ESL workshop in Kraków, Poland. Dilip is actively involved with The Perfect Relations Centre for Image Management Studies, a learning institute backed by Perfect Relations.
Dilip is also a member of the National Advisory Board of Whistling Woods International film school in India which is affiliated with several international film schools.
In addition to this, he has also spoken at the National Marketing Conclave at Kalinga Institute of Industrial Technology (KIIT).

Training

Dilip trains individuals & corporate professionals on business networking, image management- including managing their online image, helping them decode their leadership DNAs. One example of work in this area may illustrate it well. Dilip is among the panel of experts at the Savoir Faire Academie.  
He has also been regularly involved in trainings at the World Bank and Sardar Vallabhbhai Patel National Police Academy in communication and media skills.

Analytics & Public Advisory

Dilip has been observing and analyzing the political arena in the country, since 1980. This results in his active participation in discussions around the Indian general Election, 2014. He writes regular articles in leading newspapers commenting on the Indian general Elections, the campaigning process  and has also been a panel member on television news discussions for the Indian political system.

Dilip's experience in the public affairs and advocacy sector has spanned over 2 decades now. Some of Dilip's noted work achievements in lobbying were the improvement in the perception of his client ITC when BAT (British American Tobacco) was unable to acquire the organization and his lobbying for the import duty cuts on packaging material which he achieved while working for TetraPack.

Board commitments

Dilip has recently been appointed as a member of PR Lions Jury at 60th Cannes Lions International Festival of Creativity, 16–22 June 2013, Cannes, France.

He has been on the governing board of the Advertising Standards Council of India, which oversees ethics, and practices of players in the media space. He is also the Honorary Director General of the Centre of Image Management Studies - a communication school that is a cooperative venture between several national agencies. He is a member of the Board of Governing Council of the National Institute of Design (NID) and the Apex Committee of Shareholder Education and Grievance Redressal of the Ministry of Company Affairs.

Dilip has been elected to IPRA's (International Public Relations Association) Global Council as the India Council Member. He is also Advisor to the President of the Federation of Indian Chambers of Commerce & Industry (FICCI).

Community work
Dilip is actively involved in initiatives ranging from concern for reproductive health issues via his membership of the Population Alliance and schemes, to providing computers for education in various parts of India through his association with the NGO to the One Laptop Per Child Alliance program.
He serves as a board member of Charkha; an NGO committed to using communications tools, to reach out to the masses, through success stories of development initiatives and is also an Advisory Board Member of the non-profit organization, JIVA Institute.

References

External links
 

Year of birth missing (living people)
Living people
Indian public relations people
Don Bosco schools alumni
University of Calcutta alumni